The Corgo Viaduct is a viaduct in Portugal. It is located in the Vila Real District, crossing the Corgo River. It is part of the A4 highway. Vila Real Bridge has a concrete deck, with the  main span supported by two pylons. It carries four lanes of road traffic on its  deck.

See also

References 

Bridges in Portugal
Toll bridges in Portugal
Buildings and structures in Vila Real District
Cable-stayed bridges in Portugal